Matheus Rossetto (born 3 June 1996) is a Brazilian professional footballer who plays as a midfielder for Major League Soccer club Atlanta United.

Club career
Born in Santo Amaro da Imperatriz, Santa Catarina, Rossetto joined Atlético Paranaense's youth setup in 2009, aged 12. He made his first team debut on 2 May 2015, coming on as a half-time substitute for goalscorer Nikão in a 5–0 Campeonato Paranaense home routing of Nacional.

On 15 December 2015 Rossetto was loaned to Ferroviária, along with other Atlético teammates. He scored his first senior goal on 25 February of the following year, netting his team's first in a 2–3 away loss against Ituano.

Returning to Furacão in May 2016, Rossetto made his Série A on 30 July by replacing Juninho in a 0–2 loss at Sport. He scored his first top flight goal on 5 October, netting the last in a 3–1 home win against Chapecoense; two days later, he renewed his contract until 2020.

On 3 February 2020, Rossetto joined Major League Soccer side Atlanta United.

Career statistics

Club

Honours
Athletico Paranaense
Copa do Brasil: 2019
Campeonato Paranaense: 2019
Copa Sudamericana: 2018
J.League Cup / Copa Sudamericana Championship: 2019

References

External links

1996 births
Living people
Sportspeople from Santa Catarina (state)
Brazilian footballers
Association football midfielders
Campeonato Brasileiro Série A players
Club Athletico Paranaense players
Associação Ferroviária de Esportes players
Atlanta United FC players
Major League Soccer players
Brazilian expatriate footballers
Brazilian expatriate sportspeople in the United States
Expatriate soccer players in the United States